Carsten Wieland is a political consultant and journalist, specialized in Middle Eastern affairs, he has written a number of books concerning Syria and the Syrian civil war.

Biography

Carsten Wieland was born in 1971, Mannheim, southwest Germany. At present he works as a political consultant in Europe and the United States.

Works
Syria at Bay: Secularism, Islamism and "Pax Americana", 2006.
Syria - A Decade of Lost Chances: Repression and Revolution from Damascus Spring to Arab Spring
The Syrian Uprising: Dynamics of an Insurgency, 2013.
Syria: Ballots Or Bullets?: Democracy, Islamism, and Secularism in the Levant, 2006.

References

External links
Official website

1971 births
German journalists
German male journalists
Living people
German male writers